Emamzadeh Esmaeil is a historical complex in Isfahan, Iran, which dates back to the Seljuk and Safavid era. This complex is located near the Jameh Mosque of Isfahan, in the Hatef street and contains two mausoleums, one believed to be for Esmaeil, one of grandsons of Hasan ibn Ali, and another which is believed to be Isaiah's.

History 
Nastaliq inscription on the northern wall says that the building dates back to Imam Ali's era, but according to archeological research the building is no older than the Seljuk era. During the Safavid era, the building was completely renovated.

Isaiah Mausoleum 
The oldest part of this complex, it contains a tomb believed to belong to Prophet Isaiah. This place was also known as "Saiah Mosque".

Other burials 
There are two gravestones in the Imamzadeh. One of the gravestones belongs to Zeinab ol Nissa Begum who was the daughter of the last Safavid king Ismail III. Another one belongs to a Shi'ite Muslim scholar, Hadi Mirlohi.

See also 
List of the historical structures in the Isfahan province

References 

Architecture in Iran
Buildings and structures in Isfahan